Raucous Records is a British record label focusing on rockabilly, psychobilly, rock and roll, and surf music.  The label has released albums such as "Between The Polecats" by The Polecats, "Rock 'n' Roll Fever" by Jay Chance, "Rockabilly Express" by Gary Setzer and Barry Ryan, "The Lost Album" by The Meteors, "Real Gone Katz" by The Go-Katz, "Reeferbilly Blowout" by The Shakin' Pyramids, "My Ol' Guitar" by Gary Bennett ex-BR5-49, and "This is Rockabilly Clash" by various Rockabilly bands performing the songs of The Clash.

The label was formed in 1987 by Howard Raucous, initially to release a vinyl EP by his psychobilly band The Go-Katz,  Initially based in Loughborough, Leicestershire, relocating in the early 1990s to Fleetwood, Lancashire.

British record labels